The Kuwait Amir/Emir Cup is a Kuwaiti football competition created in 1962. The Emir Cup, is the last football competition held in the Kuwaiti football season. It is considered the most valuable cup.

Al Arabi SC is the only team to go to the final 11 consecutive times since 1962 up to 1972 holding the record.

Results 

The teams who also won the Kuwaiti Premier League are listed below in green:

Performance By Club

External links 
 goalzz.com – Kuwait Emir Cup
 RSSSF.com – Kuwait – List of Cup Winners
 Kuwait Emir Cup – Hailoosport.com (Arabic)
 Kuwait Emir Cup – Hailoosport.com

 
1
National association football cups
Recurring sporting events established in 1962
1962 establishments in Kuwait